The New York Guitar Show was an annual charitable event- a two-day vintage guitar exhibition and sale scheduled on the third weekend in September and held at the Mary Help of Christians Church on E. 12th St. and Avenue A in New York City attended by vintage guitar dealers from across the United States. Over the span of a 15-year period (1986–2000) the New York Guitar Show was the only regularly scheduled vintage guitar event dedicated entirely to charity in the United States.

Originally started by Ken and Kathy Heer, East Village music dealers (Saint Mark's Music Exchange) in 1983–84 at a midtown Manhattan hotel as a for-profit event, the production was purchased by Skip Henderson, an ex-social worker turned vintage guitar dealer (City Lights Music) from New Brunswick, New Jersey, moved to the Mary Help of Christians church auditorium at E.12th St. and Ave. A, and changed into a not-for-profit venture primarily to support the AIDS Resource Foundation for Children in Newark, New Jersey. Henderson later went on to establish the non-profit Mt. Zion Memorial Fund in Clarksdale, Mississippi to assist rural black churches in the Mississippi Delta.

The New York Guitar Show was also a venue for a Saturday night performance series that Henderson produced over the lifespan of the event. These shows featured an eclectic array of performers such as Nokie Edwards of the Ventures, guitar maker Semie Moseley, Junior Brown, The LeRoi Brothers, Lonnie Pitchford, Elliot Easton of The Cars, YouTube favorites The Otis Brothers featuring Bob Guida (an early financial backer of the event), and numerous others. In 1996 as Henderson became more involved with the activities of the Mt. Zion Fund, production of the show was transferred to another vintage guitar dealer James Pasch, with the contractual stipulation that it remain a fundraising event for the AIDS Resource Foundation for Children. 
 
Primarily because of its East Village location, the event was known for attracting a diverse crowd of notable musicians and figures from New York City such as Billy Idol, Allen Ginsberg, Lenny Kravitz, Willy DeVille, and many others.

In 2013 Mary Help of Christians Church, the original site of the guitar show, was sold for $41 million and demolished despite protests from Greenwich Village historic preservationists. In 1993 Skip Henderson produced a Chorale "The Faith of Avenue A", consisting of selections sung by the Mary Help of Christians Choir. The project, professionally recorded on Neumann microphones by Rob Campbell in the sanctuary, stands as the only recording ever done in the Church.

References

1986 establishments in New York City
1986 in New York City
1980s in Manhattan
Recurring events established in 1986
Charity events in the United States
Annual events in New York City
Culture of Manhattan
East Village, Manhattan
Cultural history of New York City